Chambas is a municipality and town in the Ciego de Ávila Province of Cuba.

Geography
It is located in the northern part of the province, bordering the municipalities of Morón and Florencia, as well as the province of Sancti Spíritus. To the north it borders the Bay of Buena Vista and the Laguna de Leche.

It comprises the villages of El Asiento, El Calvario, Falla, Kilo 9, Las Palmas, Los Perros, Mabuya, Piedra, Punta Alegre, Punta San Juan (Maxímo Gómez Sugar Mill) and Ranchuelo.

Demographics
In 2004, the municipality of Chambas had a population of 39,868.

See also
Chicola
Chambas Municipal Museum
Municipalities of Cuba
List of cities in Cuba

References

External links

Populated places in Ciego de Ávila Province